Sung-min, also spelled Seong-min, is a Korean unisex given name (predominantly masculine). Its meaning differs based on the hanja used to write each syllable of the name. There are 27 hanja with the reading "sung" and 27 hanja with the reading "min" on the South Korean government's official list of hanja which may be registered for use in given names. Sung-min was the eighth-most popular name for baby boys in South Korea in 1970, rising to second place in 1980, where it remained in 1990.

People with this name include:

Entertainers
Lee Sung-min (actor) (born 1968), South Korean actor
Hong Seong-min (born 1976), stage name Hong Kyung-min, South Korean singer and actor
Lee Sung-min (1985), stage name Clara Lee, actress and model active in South Korea
Lee Sung-min (singer) (born 1986), South Korean singer, member of boy band Super Junior
Choi Sung-min (actor) (born 1995), South Korean singer and actor, member of boy band Speed

Footballers
Kim Sung-min (footballer born 1981), South Korean football goalkeeper
An Sung-min (born 1985), South Korean football midfielder
Kim Sung-min (footballer born 1985), South Korean football forward
Yoon Soung-min (born 1985), South Korean football midfielder
Lee Sung-min (footballer) (born 1986), South Korean football striker
Ha Sung-min (born 1987), South Korean football midfielder
Jung Sung-min (born 1989), South Korean football forward
Hwang Sung-min (born 1991), South Korean football goalkeeper

Other sportspeople
Cho Sung-min (1973–2013), South Korean baseball player
Moon Sung-min (born 1986), South Korean volleyball player
Kim Sung-min (judoka) (born 1987), South Korean judoka
Cho Sung-min (sailor) (born 1987), South Korean sailor

Other
Chang Sŏng-min (born 1963), South Korean politician

See also
List of Korean given names
Yoo Seong-min (born 1958), South Korean politician

References

Korean unisex given names